Glenea is a genus of longhorn beetles belonging to the family Cerambycidae, subfamily Lamiinae.

Species
An incomplete list of species includes:

subgenus Accolona
 Glenea astathiformis Breuning, 1958
 Glenea superba Breuning, 1958

subgenus Acronioglenea
 Glenea besucheti Breuning, 1974

subgenus Acutoglenea
 Glenea acuta (Fabricius, 1801)
 Glenea albovittata Breuning, 1956
 Glenea cardinalis Thomson, 1860
 Glenea dimorpha Vives, 2005
 Glenea erythrodera Gahan, 1907
 Glenea extensa Pascoe, 1858
 Glenea langana Pic, 1903
 Glenea numerifera J. Thomson, 1865
 Glenea subochracea Breuning, 1958
 Glenea theodosia J. Thomson, 1879
 Glenea versuta Newman, 1832

subgenus Annuliglenea
 Glenea annuliventris (Pic, 1926)

subgenus Aridoglenea
 Glenea arida Thomson, 1865
 Glenea biannulata Breuning, 1961
 Glenea cancellata Thomson, 1865
 Glenea decolorata Heller, 1926
 Glenea delkeskampi Breuning, 1961
 Glenea diversesignata Pic, 1943
 Glenea flavorubra Gressitt, 1940
 Glenea lineatithorax Pic, 1926
 Glenea meridionalis Pic, 1943
 Glenea obsoleta Aurivillius, 1914
 Glenea pseudovaga Breuning, 1961
 Glenea scopifera Pascoe, 1859
 Glenea shuteae M.Y. Lin & X.K. Yang, 2011
 Glenea subarida Breuning, 1958
 Glenea vaga Thomson, 1865
 Glenea vagemaculipennis Breuning, 1961

subgenus Bajoglenea
 Glenea baja Jordan, 1903
 Glenea pseudobaja Breuning, 1952

subgenus Brunneoglenea
 Glenea brunnipennis Breuning, 1958
 Glenea salwattyana Breuning, 1966

subgenus Citrinoglenea
 Glenea anterufipennis Breuning, 1968
 Glenea citrina J. Thomson, 1865
 Glenea gardneriana Breuning, 1958

subgenus Cylindroglenea
 Glenea cylindrica Aurivillius

subgenus Elongatoglenea
 Glenea carinipennis Breuning, 1961
 Glenea elongatipennis Breuning, 1952
 Glenea nigroscutellaris Breuning, 1973
 Glenea rufipennis Breuning, 1952

subgenus Euglenea
 Glenea sarasinorum Heller, 1896

subgenus Fasciculoglenea
 Glenea fasciculosa Breuning

subgenus Formosoglenea
 Glenea ochreomaculata Breuning, 1969

subgenus Grossoglenea
 Glenea grandis Schwarzer, 1929

subgenus Jordanoglenea
 Glenea jordani Lepesme & Breuning, 1952

subgenus Lineatoglenea
 Glenea lineatopunctata Breuning, 1950

subgenus Luteoglenea
 Glenea maculicollis Breuning, 1950

subgenus Macroglenea
 Glenea beatrix Thomson, 1879
 Glenea bisbiguttata Ritsema, 1892
 Glenea corona Thomson, 1879
 Glenea elegans (Olivier, 1795)
 Glenea florensis Ritsema, 1892
 Glenea hasselti Ritsema, 1892
 Glenea juno J. Thomson, 1865
 Glenea nivea Ritsema, 1892
 Glenea nympha J. Thomson, 1865
 Glenea similis Ritsema, 1892
 Glenea venus Thomson, 1865

subgenus Menesioglenea
 Glenea menesioides Breuning, 1969

subgenus Mesoglenea
 Glenea invitticollis Breuning, 1956

subgenus Metaglenea
 Glenea pseudograndis Breuning, 1956

subgenus Moraegamus
 Glenea flavicapilla (Chevrolat, 1858)

subgenus Parazosne
 Glenea leucospilota (Westwood, 1841)
 Glenea sangirica Aurivillius, 1903
 Glenea estanleyi (Vives, 2009)

subgenus Poeciloglenea
 Glenea celestis Thomson, 1865
 Glenea celia Pascoe, 1888

subgenus Porphyrioglenea
 Glenea porphyrio Pascoe, 1866

subgenus Pseudotanylecta
 Glenea aterrima Breuning, 1956
 Glenea itzingeri Breuning, 1956
 Glenea keili Ritsema, 1897
 Glenea ochreoplagiata Breuning, 1956
 Glenea speciosa Gahan, 1889
 Glenea tibialis Gahan, 1907

subgenus Punctoglenea
 Glenea francisi Hüdepohl, 1990
 Glenea sexpunctata Aurivillius, 1926

subgenus Reginoglenea
 Glenea perakensis Breuning, 1956
 Glenea regina J. Thomson, 1865

subgenus Rubroglenea
 Glenea nigrorubricollis Lin & Yang, 2009
 Glenea rubricollis (Hope, 1842)
 Glenea subrubricollis Lin & Tavakilian, 2009

subgenus Rufoglenea
 Glenea bankoi Garreau, 2011
 Glenea rufopunctata Gahan, 1907

subgenus Sassoglenea
 Glenea sassensis Breuning

subgenus Spiniglenea
 Glenea spinosipennis Breuning, 1958

subgenus Stiroglenea
 Glenea andamanica Breuning, 1958
 Glenea andrewesi Gahan, 1893
 Glenea angerona J. Thomson, 1865
 Glenea cantor (Fabricius, 1787)
 Glenea grossepunctata Breuning, 1958
 Glenea homospila Thomson, 1865
 Glenea krausemani Breuning, 1958
 Glenea pseudocantor Breuning, 1958
 Glenea quadrinotata Guérin-Ménéville, 1843
 Glenea spilota Thomson, 1860

subgenus Subgrossoglenea
 Glenea ochreosignata Hüdepohl, 1995
 Glenea subgrandis Breuning, 1956
 Glenea wongi Hüdepohl, 1987

subgenus Tanylecta
 Glenea aegoprepiformis Breuning, 1950
 Glenea lambii (Pascoe, 1866)
 Glenea paralambi Breuning, 1972

subgenus Vanikoroglenea
 Glenea vanikorensis Breuning, 1956

subgenus Vittiglenea
 Glenea kraatzi Thomson, 1865
 Glenea lateflavovittata Breuning, 1980

subgenus Volumnia
 Glenea apicalis (Chevrolat, 1857)
 Glenea jeanneli Breuning, 1958
 Glenea longula Breuning, 1964
 Glenea morosa (Pascoe, 1888)
 Glenea submorosa Breuning, 1952

subgenus Glenea
 Glenea acutipennis Breuning, 1950
 Glenea acutoides Schwarzer, 1925
 Glenea adelpha Thomson, 1858
 Glenea aeolis Thomson, 1879
 Glenea afghana Breuning, 1971
 Glenea albocingulata Aurivillius, 1925
 Glenea albofasciata Gahan, 1897
 Glenea albofasciolata Breuning, 1956
 Glenea albolineata Thomson, 1860
 Glenea albolineosa Breuning, 1956
 Glenea alboplagiata Breuning, 1958
 Glenea alboscutellaris Breuning, 1958
 Glenea albosignatipennis Breuning, 1950
 Glenea albotarsalis Breuning, 1956
 Glenea algebraica (J. Thomson, 1857)
 Glenea aluensis Gahan, 1897
 Glenea amoena Thomson, 1865
 Glenea anticepunctata (J. Thomson, 1857)
 Glenea aphrodite Thomson, 1865
 Glenea apicaloides Breuning, 1958
 Glenea apicepurpurata Hüdepohl, 1990
 Glenea arithmetica (Thomson, 1857)
 Glenea arouensis Thomson, 1858
 Glenea artemis Aurivillius, 1924
 Glenea aspasia Pascoe, 1867
 Glenea assamana Breuning, 1967
 Glenea assamensis Breuning, 1950
 Glenea astarte Thomson, 1865
 Glenea atriceps Aurivillius, 1911
 Glenea atricilla Pesarini & Sabbadini, 1997
 Glenea atricornis Pic, 1943
 Glenea aurivillii Fisher, 1935
 Glenea bakeriana Breuning, 1958
 Glenea balingiti Hüdepohl, 1996
 Glenea balteata (Klug, 1835)
 Glenea bangueyensis Aurivillius, 1920
 Glenea baramensis Breuning, 1950
 Glenea basalis Thomson, 1865
 Glenea basiflavofemorata Breuning, 1956
 Glenea basilana Pic, 1943
 Glenea bellona Thomson, 1879
 Glenea benguetana Aurivillius, 1926
 Glenea bicolor Schwarzer, 1924
 Glenea bidiscovittata Breuning, 1969
 Glenea bimaculicollis Thomson, 1860
 Glenea bimaculipennis Breuning, 1961
 Glenea bisbivittata Aurivillius, 1903
 Glenea bivittata Aurivillius, 1903
 Glenea blandina Pascoe, 1858
 Glenea boafoi Breuning, 1978
 Glenea borneensis Fisher, 1935
 Glenea bryanti Breuning, 1958
 Glenea buquetii Thomson, 1865
 Glenea calypso Pascoe, 1867
 Glenea camelina Pascoe, 1867
 Glenea camilla Pascoe, 1867
 Glenea canidia Thomson, 1865
 Glenea caninia Heller, 1926
 Glenea capriciosa (Thomson, 1857)
 Glenea caraga Heller, 1921
 Glenea carneipes Chevrolat, 1855
 Glenea centralis Breuning, 1956
 Glenea centroguttata Fairmaire, 1897
 Glenea chalybeata Thomson, 1860
 Glenea changchini Lin & Lin, 2011
 Glenea chlorospila Gahan, 1897
 Glenea chrysomaculata Schwarzer, 1925
 Glenea chujoi Mitono, 1937
 Glenea cinerea Thomson, 1865
 Glenea cinna Pascoe, 1867
 Glenea clavifera Aurivillius, 1925
 Glenea cleome Pascoe, 1867
 Glenea clytoides (Pascoe, 1867)
 Glenea colenda Thomson, 1879
 Glenea collaris Pascoe, 1858
 Glenea colobotheoides Thomson, 1865
 Glenea concinna Newman, 1842
 Glenea consanguis Aurivillius, 1925
 Glenea coris Pascoe, 1867
 Glenea crucicollis Breuning, 1956
 Glenea crucipennis Breuning, 1950
 Glenea curvilinea Aurivillius, 1926
 Glenea cyanipennis Thomson, 1858
 Glenea cylindrepomoides Thomson, 1865
 Glenea decemguttata Aurivillius, 1920
 Glenea dejeani Gahan, 1889
 Glenea despecta Pascoe, 1858
 Glenea diana Thomson, 1865
 Glenea dido Aurivillius, 1926
 Glenea didyma Aurivillius, 1903
 Glenea difficilis Lin & Tavakilian, 2009
 Glenea dimidiata (Fabricius, 1801)
 Glenea disa Aurivillius, 1911
 Glenea discofasciata Breuning, 1983
 Glenea discoidalis Pascoe, 1867
 Glenea discomaculata Breuning, 1956
 Glenea diverselineata Pic, 1926
 Glenea doriai Breuning, 1950
 Glenea dorsalis Schwarzer, 1930
 Glenea dorsaloides Breuning, 1956
 Glenea elegantissima Breuning, 1956
 Glenea enganensis Breuning, 1982
 Glenea exculta Newman, 1842
 Glenea extrema Sharp, 1900
 Glenea fasciata (Fabricius, 1781)
 Glenea fatalis Pascoe, 1867
 Glenea fissicauda Aurivillius, 1926
 Glenea flava Jordan, 1895
 Glenea flavicollis Aurivillius, 1926
 Glenea flavotincta Aurivillius, 1926
 Glenea flavovittata Aurivillius, 1920
 Glenea fortii Pesarini & Sabbadini, 1997
 Glenea fulvomaculata Thomson, 1860
 Glenea funerula (J. Thomson, 1857)
 Glenea gabonica (Thomson, 1858)
 Glenea gahani Jordan, 1894
 Glenea galathea Thomson, 1865
 Glenea giannii Hüdepohl, 1996
 Glenea giraffa Dalman, 1817
 Glenea glabronotata Pesarini & Sabbadini, 1997
 Glenea glauca Newman, 1842
 Glenea glaucescens Aurivillius, 1903
 Glenea glechomoides Breuning, 1982
 Glenea grisea Thomson, 1860
 Glenea griseolineata Breuning, 1956
 Glenea helleri Aurivillius, 1923
 Glenea heptagona Thomson, 1860
 Glenea hieroglyphica Pesarini & Sabbadini, 1997
 Glenea humeralis Aurivillius, 1926
 Glenea humeroinvittata Breuning, 1956
 Glenea iligana Aurivillius, 1926
 Glenea illuminata (Thomson, 1857)
 Glenea indiana (Thomson, 1857)
 Glenea infraflava Breuning, 1969
 Glenea infragrisea Breuning, 1958
 Glenea insignis Aurivillius, 1903
 Glenea intermixta Aurivillius, 1926
 Glenea interrupta Thomson, 1860
 Glenea iphia Pascoe, 1867
 Glenea iresine Pascoe, 1867
 Glenea iridescens Pascoe, 1867
 Glenea iriei Hayashi, 1971
 Glenea iwasakii Kono, 1933
 Glenea jeanvoinei Pic, 1927
 Glenea johani Hüdepohl, 1996
 Glenea johnstoni Gahan, 1902
 Glenea joliveti Breuning, 1970
 Glenea kinabaluensis Fisher, 1935
 Glenea kusamai Makihara, 1988
 Glenea labuanensis Breuning, 1956
 Glenea lachrymosa Pascoe, 1867
 Glenea laosensis Breuning, 1956
 Glenea latevittata Aurivillius, 1920
 Glenea laudata Pascoe, 1867
 Glenea lefebvrei (Guérin-Méneville, 1831)
 Glenea lepida Newman, 1842
 Glenea leucomaculata Breuning,
 Glenea licenti Pic, 1939
 Glenea lineata Gahan, 1897
 Glenea lineatocollis Thomson, 1860
 Glenea loosdregti Breuning, 1965
 Glenea lugubris Thomson, 1865
 Glenea lunulata Jordan, 1894
 Glenea lycoris Thomson, 1865
 Glenea malasiaca Thomson, 1865
 Glenea manto Pascoe, 1866
 Glenea masakii Makihara, 1978
 Glenea matangensis Aurivillius, 1911
 Glenea mathematica (Thomson, 1857)
 Glenea medea Pascoe, 1867
 Glenea melia Pascoe, 1867
 Glenea melissa Pascoe, 1867
 Glenea mephisto Thomson, 1879
 Glenea mesoleuca Pascoe, 1867
 Glenea mimoscalaris Breuning, 1969
 Glenea minerva Aurivillius, 1922
 Glenea miniacea Pascoe, 1867
 Glenea mira Jordan, 1903
 Glenea montivaga Gahan, 1909
 Glenea montrouzieri Thomson, 1865
 Glenea mouhoti Thomson, 1865
 Glenea moultoni Aurivillius, 1913
 Glenea mounieri Breuning, 1956
 Glenea moutrouzieri Thomson, 1865
 Glenea multiguttata (Guérin-Méneville, 1843)
 Glenea myrsine Pascoe, 1867
 Glenea negrosiana Hüdepohl, 1996
 Glenea newmani Thomson, 1874
 Glenea nicanor Pascoe, 1867
 Glenea nigeriae Aurivillius, 1920
 Glenea nigrifrons Aurivillius, 1920
 Glenea nigroapicalis Breuning, 1956
 Glenea nigrotibialis Breuning, 1950
 Glenea niobe J. Thomson, 1879
 Glenea nitidicollis Aurivillius, 1920
 Glenea niveipectus Aurivillius, 1926
 Glenea nobilis Schwarzer, 1931
 Glenea novemguttata (Guérin-Méneville, 1831)
 Glenea ochraceolineata Schwarzer, 1931
 Glenea ochraceovittata J. Thomson, 1865
 Glenea ochreicollis Breuning, 1950
 Glenea ochreobivittata Breuning, 1956
 Glenea ochreosuturalis Breuning, 1958
 Glenea ochreovittata Breuning, 1950
 Glenea ochreovittipennis Breuning, 1958
 Glenea octoguttata Breuning, 1956
 Glenea octomaculata Aurivillius, 1927
 Glenea oeme Pascoe, 1866
 Glenea oemeoides Breuning, 1950
 Glenea olbrechtsi Breuning, 1952
 Glenea omeiensis Chiang, 1963
 Glenea oriformis Breuning, 1958
 Glenea ossifera Jordan, 1894
 Glenea pagana Aurivillius, 1926
 Glenea papuensis Gahan, 1897
 Glenea paracarneipes Breuning, 1977
 Glenea paradiana Lin & Montreuil, 2009
 Glenea parahumerointerrupta Breuning, 1982
 Glenea paralepida Breuning, 1980
 Glenea paramephisto Breuning, 1972
 Glenea paramounieri Breuning, 1982
 Glenea parartensis Breuning, 1966
 Glenea parasauteri Breuning, 1980
 Glenea parasuavis Breuning, 1982
 Glenea parexculta Breuning, 1980
 Glenea pascoei Aurivillius, 1923
 Glenea pendleburyi Fisher, 1935
 Glenea peregoi Breuning, 1949
 Glenea peria Thomson, 1865
 Glenea philippensis Breuning, 1958
 Glenea pici Aurivillius, 1925
 Glenea pieliana Gressitt, 1939
 Glenea plagiata Gardner, 1930
 Glenea plagicollis Aurivillius, 1925
 Glenea plagifera Aurivillius, 1913
 Glenea posticata Gahan, 1895
 Glenea problematica Lin & Yang, 2009
 Glenea propinqua Gahan, 1897
 Glenea proserpina J. Thomson, 1865
 Glenea proxima Lameere, 1893
 Glenea pseudadelia Breuning, 1956
 Glenea pseudocaninia Lin & Montreuil, 2009
 Glenea pseudocolobotheoides Breuning, 1950
 Glenea pseudogiraffa Báguena & Breuning, 1958
 Glenea pseudoindiana Lin & Yang, 2009
 Glenea pseudolaudata Breuning, 1956
 Glenea pseudomephisto Breuning, 1969
 Glenea pseudomyrsine Breuning, 1956
 Glenea pseudopuella Breuning, 1958
 Glenea pseudoregularis Breuning, 1956
 Glenea pseudoscalaris (Fairmaire, 1895)
 Glenea pseudosuavis Breuning, 1956
 Glenea puella Chevrolat, 1858
 Glenea pujoli Breuning, 1970
 Glenea pulchella Pascoe, 1858
 Glenea pulchra Aurivillius, 1926
 Glenea pustulata J. Thomson, 1865
 Glenea quadriochreomaculata Breuning, 1966
 Glenea quatuordecimmaculata (Hope, 1831)
 Glenea quatuordecimpunctata Breuning, 1956
 Glenea quezonica Hüdepohl, 1996
 Glenea quinquelineata Chevrolat, 1855
 Glenea quinquevittata Aurivillius, 1926
 Glenea referens Aurivillius, 1926
 Glenea regularis Newman, 1842
 Glenea relicta Pascoe, 1868
 Glenea robinsoni Gahan, 1906
 Glenea rondoni Breuning, 1963
 Glenea rubripennis Breuning, 1961
 Glenea rubrobasicornis Breuning, 1962
 Glenea rufa Breuning, 1956
 Glenea rufifrons Aurivillius, 1920
 Glenea rufipes Gressitt, 1939
 Glenea rufobasaloides Breuning, 1961
 Glenea rufuloantennata Breuning, 1966
 Glenea samarensis Aurivillius, 1926
 Glenea sanctaemariae (Thomson, 1857)
 Glenea sangirensis Breuning, 1956
 Glenea saperdoides J. Thomson, 1860
 Glenea scalaris Thomson, 1865
 Glenea schwarzeri Fisher, 1935
 Glenea sedecimmaculata Breuning, 1950
 Glenea sejuncta Pascoe, 1867
 Glenea selangorensis Breuning, 1961
 Glenea sexguttata Aurivillius, 1925
 Glenea sexnotata 
 Glenea sexplagiata Aurivillius, 1913
 Glenea sexvitticollis Breuning, 1950
 Glenea sikkimensis Breuning, 1982
 Glenea sjoestedti Aurivillius, 1903
 Glenea smaragdina Breuning, 1956
 Glenea sordida Aurivillius, 1924
 Glenea splendidula Hüdepohl, 1996
 Glenea strigata Thomson, 1860
 Glenea suavis Newman, 1842
 Glenea subadelia Breuning, 1969
 Glenea subelegantissima Breuning, 1982
 Glenea subgrisea Breuning, 1958
 Glenea subhuonora Breuning, 1956
 Glenea submajor Breuning, 1960
 Glenea subregularis Pic, 1943
 Glenea subsimilis Gahan, 1897
 Glenea substellata Breuning, 1956
 Glenea subviridescens Breuning, 1963 inq.
 Glenea suensoni Heyrovský, 1939
 Glenea sulphurea Thomson, 1865
 Glenea sulphuroides Breuning, 1982
 Glenea suturalis Jordan, 1894
 Glenea suturata Gressitt, 1939
 Glenea suturefasciata Breuning, 1956
 Glenea suturevittata Breuning, 1958
 Glenea sylvia Thomson, 1879
 Glenea t-notata Gahan, 1889
 Glenea taeniata J. Thomson, 1860
 Glenea telmissa Pascoe, 1867
 Glenea tenuilineata Breuning, 1956
 Glenea thomsoni Pascoe, 1867
 Glenea transversefasciata Hüdepohl, 1996
 Glenea transversevittipennis Breuning, 1956
 Glenea triangulifera Aurivillius, 1926
 Glenea trimaculipennis Breuning, 1959
 Glenea tringaria Pascoe, 1867
 Glenea tritoleuca Aurivillius, 1924
 Glenea trivittata Aurivillius, 1911
 Glenea truncatipennis Breuning, 1956
 Glenea univittata Aurivillius, 1924
 Glenea ustulata Breuning, 1956
 Glenea varifascia Thomson, 1865
 Glenea venusta (Guérin-Méneville, 1831)
 Glenea vietnamana Breuning, 1972
 Glenea vigintiduomaculata (Thomson, 1858)
 Glenea vingerhoedti Téocchi & Sudre, 2003
 Glenea viridescens Pic, 1927
 Glenea vittulata Aurivillius, 1920
 Glenea voluptuosa Thomson, 1860
 Glenea wallacei Gahan, 1897
 Glenea wegneri Gilmour & Breuning, 1963
 Glenea weigeli Lin & Liu, 2012
 Glenea wiedenfeldi Aurivillius, 1911
 Glenea x-nigrum Aurivillius, 1913
 Glenea xanthotaenia Gestro, 1875

References

 
Saperdini
Cerambycidae genera
Taxa named by Edward Newman